Jan Rajewski (14 May 1857 – 30/31 December 1906) was a Polish mathematician and prominent professor of the University of Lviv.

External links
Mathematics at Lviv University

Polish mathematicians
1857 births
1906 deaths
Burials at Lychakiv Cemetery